Tensift may refer to:
Tensift (region), a region in Morocco
Tensift River, a river in central Morocco